Number 18 School in Marshall is a historic one-room school located at Marshall, Fauquier County, Virginia. It was built about 1887, and is a rectangular frame building, covered with weatherboard, and resting on a stone foundation, with a metal gable roof with a centrally located brick stove flue.  Atop the roof is a reconstructed cupola.  It is the only surviving unimpaired one-room schoolhouse in Fauquier County.  It was originally constructed for white students, then from the fall of 1910 to 1964 (when it closed), a school for African-American children.

It was listed on the National Register of Historic Places in 1997.

References

One-room schoolhouses in Virginia
School buildings on the National Register of Historic Places in Virginia
School buildings completed in 1887
Schools in Fauquier County, Virginia
National Register of Historic Places in Fauquier County, Virginia